Xie Tieli (27 December 1925 – 19 June 2015) was a Chinese director. In 2011, China Film Directors Guild Award awarded him the Lifetime Achievement Award.

Selected filmography

References

External links

1925 births
2015 deaths
Film directors from Jiangsu
Screenwriters from Jiangsu
People from Huai'an
People of the Republic of China